The 2018–19 NJIT Highlanders men's basketball team represented the New Jersey Institute of Technology during the 2018–19 NCAA Division I men's basketball season. The Highlanders, led by third-year head coach Brian Kennedy, played their home games at the Wellness and Events Center in Newark, New Jersey as members of the Atlantic Sun Conference (ASUN). They finished the season 22–13, 8–8 in ASUN play to finish in fifth place. They defeated Florida Gulf Coast in the quarterfinals of the ASUN tournament before losing in the semifinals to Lipscomb. They were invited to the CollegeInsider.com Tournament where they defeated Quinnipiac in the first round before losing in the quarterfinals to Hampton.

Previous season
The Highlanders finished the 2017–18 season 14–16, 7–7 in ASUN play to finish in a tie for fourth place. They lost in the quarterfinals of the ASUN tournament to North Florida.

Roster

Schedule and results

|-
!colspan=9 style=| Non-conference regular season

|-
!colspan=9 style=| Atlantic Sun Conference regular season

|-
!colspan=9 style=| Atlantic Sun tournament

|-
!colspan=12 style=|CollegeInsider.com Postseason tournament
|-

Source

References

NJIT Highlanders men's basketball seasons
Njit
NJIT
NJIT
Njit